Roger Skauen (born 11 November 1934) is a Norwegian wrestler. He competed in the men's Greco-Roman lightweight at the 1960 Summer Olympics.

References

External links
 

1934 births
Living people
Norwegian male sport wrestlers
Olympic wrestlers of Norway
Wrestlers at the 1960 Summer Olympics
Sportspeople from Fredrikstad